Fernando Romboli and Júlio Silva were the defending champions but Romboli decided not to participate.
Silva played alongside Thiago Alves but they lost in the first round.
James Cerretani and Adil Shamasdin won the final 6–7(5–7), 6–1, [11–9] against Federico Delbonis and Renzo Olivo to capture the title.

Seeds

Draw

Draw

References
 Main Draw

Aberto de Sao Paulo - Doubles
2013 Doubles
2013 in Brazilian tennis